Liu Yumin (born February 1951) is a Chinese novelist who was the vice president of Shandong Literature and Art Association.

Biography
Liu was born into a family of farming background in Jinan, Shandong. His father died young, his mother died in the Cultural Revolution.

After meddle school, Liu worked in a local people's commune.

Liu joined the People's Liberation Army in 1970 and he started to publish works in 1971. From 1971 to 1981, Liu was serving in the Jinan Military Region.

In 1982, Liu was transferred to Jinan Literature and Art Association. He was appointed the president of Jinan Writers Association, the vice president of Shandong Literature and Art Association, and the president of Shandong Painting Academy.

Works

Dramas
 The Sunlight
 The Four Women
 The Yellow River

Novels
 Unsettled Autumn
 The Shofar
 Guolongbing
 Journey to the East

Reportages
 The Dream of City
 Biography of the Oriental Man

Proses and poems
 Loving You Every Day
 Shandong Zhuzhi Poem

Awards
 Unsettled Autumn – 4th Mao Dun Literature Prize (1998)

References

1951 births
Writers from Jinan
Living people
Mao Dun Literature Prize laureates
Chinese male novelists
People's Republic of China novelists